The 2014 European Rowing Championships was held in Belgrade, Serbia, between 30 May and 1 June 2014.

Medal summary

Men

Women

Medal table

Source

References

External links
 Official website

European Rowing Championships
2014
European Rowing Championships
Rowing in Serbia
International sports competitions in Belgrade
2010s in Belgrade
May 2014 sports events in Europe
June 2014 sports events in Europe